Saphenista saxicolana is a species of moth of the  family Tortricidae. It is found in the United States in Oregon and California.

The wingspan is about 14 mm. Adults are on wing from March to May and in July.

References

Moths described in 1879
Saphenista